Estar may refer to:

Estar, West Virginia, unincorporated community in West Virginia, United States
Estar Avia, passenger charter airline based in Russia
eSTAR project, multi-agent system that aims to implement a true heterogeneous network of robotic telescopes for automated observing
Navistar eStar, electric van by Navistar International
One of the Romance copula forms (i.e. the verb "to be")
ESTAR Base, the Eastman Kodak brand of BOPET film